Joseph Blumenthal is one of the main characters in the novel The Hope by Herman Wouk. He is more commonly known as "Yossi," and also as "Don Kishote" (Hebrew for Don Quixote). Americans call him "Joe" and Yiddish-speakers call him "Yussele." He earns his "Don Kishote" nickname when he appears at the Battle of Latrun. Tall, lanky, bespectacled, wearing an old rusty British helmet, riding a muddy mule, using a broomstick as a goad, he indeed looks like Don Quixote—only a lot younger. He is sixteen (which means he was born in 1932), but claims to be eighteen.

Born in Poland, he survives the Holocaust and makes his way to Israel by way of Cyprus. He impulsively volunteers to fight in the 1947–1949 Palestine war and is assigned as driver and aide-de-camp to Zev Barak, who in turn is aide and liaison to Mickey Marcus. Zev and Yossi enter the Jewish Quarter of the Old City of Jerusalem through tunnels. Kishote, living up to his nickname, quixotically volunteers to help defend the besieged quarter. The defenders, overwhelmingly outnumbered and outgunned, are soon forced to surrender. A massacre is prevented by the presence of British officers and of the Red Cross, but all the synagogues of the Old City are blown up and destroyed by the Arab Legion.

Meanwhile, Yossi, who is blessed with excellent spatial memory, escapes through the same tunnels through which he entered the Old City and is not part of the surrender. His next assignment is to carry sacks of flour to relieve the siege of Jerusalem. After this he returns to his job as Zev Barak's driver. Not long afterwards, however, he enters a unit commanded by Moshe Dayan and is given a lightning course on artillery. As the gunner of an armored vehicle, he is a very important element in Dayan's takeover of the towns of Lydda and Ramleh.

Over the next few years, Joseph grows from tall and lanky to big and muscular, and becomes a member of Israel's most distinguished elite combat unit, the Paratroopers Brigade. He performs acts of great heroism during the 1956 war, in which Israel clears the Sinai of Palestinian terrorists and Egyptian armies, and restores freedom of navigation through the Gulf of Aqaba.

Yossi has a brother, Leopold Blumenthal, who leaves Israel for America and changes his name to Lee Bloom. He becomes a real estate tycoon, but continues to help Israel acquire desperately needed weaponry.

Don Kishote has romantic connections with several women, but his true love is Shayna, a religious but independent-minded Jerusalem girl. However, instead of marrying her he marries Yael Luria, because she becomes pregnant in a sexual encounter both had intended to be a casual, one time affair. At the time of his marriage he changes his last name to Nitzan, the Hebrew version of the name "Bloom" adopted by his brother.

Joseph transfers from the Paratroopers to Armor. His creative exploits during maneuvers win high praise from David Ben-Gurion himself. In the Six-Day War he is injured and knocked off his tank. With the help of a nurse and of another soldier he escapes from the hospital and takes part in the Liberation of Jerusalem.

In The Glory, sequel to The Hope, Yossi is Operations Officer for Northern Command, and his advice is sought by Moshe Dayan. Later he becomes Chief of Staff for Southern Command, under Ariel Sharon. In this position, Kishote is largely responsible for the success of the Israeli crossing of the Suez Canal into Africa, which turns the tide of the Yom Kippur War.

From 1974 to 1976, Yossi Nitzan lives outside Israel. He travels in the western United States for fun, and in the Far East on business. In Australia, he reconnects with Shayna, now widowed. He manages to bring her, and her stepson Reuven, back to Israel, largely with help from Yael, who also gives Yossi what he most wants from her—a divorce. In 1976, Yossi and Shayna are at last married. Their honeymoon is cut short by the Entebbe crisis. Aryeh participates in the Entebbe Rescue (known as Operation Entebbe, Operation Thunderbolt, and Operation Yonatan). His father Yossi also has a hand in that famous deliverance.

Joseph Blumenthal/Yossi Nitzan is a Don Quixote who does not get walloped by windmills, but instead defeats the Dragons and Giants, delivers his people and nation, and wins the heart of the virtuous and beautiful lady he loves, and marries her.

References
 Herman Wouk, The Hope, (1993), 
 Herman Wouk, The Glory, (1994), 

Literary characters introduced in 1993
Characters in American novels of the 20th century
Fictional Polish Jews
Fictional Israeli Jews
Fictional Holocaust survivors
Fictional Israeli Army personnel
Fictional special forces personnel